Matteo de Senis (died 1507) was a Roman Catholic prelate who served as Bishop of Umbriatico (1500–1507).

On 7 August 1500, Matteo de Senis was appointed during the papacy of Pope Alexander VI as Bishop of Umbriatico.
He served as Bishop of Umbriatico until his death in 1507.

References

External links and additional sources
 (for Chronology of Bishops) 
 (for Chronology of Bishops) 

16th-century Italian Roman Catholic bishops
Bishops appointed by Pope Alexander VI
1507 deaths